is a Japanese actor.

Personal life
Tanaka married actress Yukie Nakama on September 18, 2014, after a six-year relationship.

Selected filmography

Film
Get Up! (2003)
One Missed Call (2004)
Umizaru (2004)
69 (2004)
Veronika Decides to Die (2005)
Into a Dream (2005)
Limit of Love: Umizaru (2005)
Water Flower (2006)
I Just Didn't Do It (2007)
Exte (2007)
Sakigake!! Otokojuku (2008)
Happy Flight (2008)
Rebirth (2011), Takehiro Akiyama
Outrage Beyond (2012), Funaki
Midsummer's Equation (2013), Keiichi Esaki
Like Father, like Son (2013)
Flying Colors (2015), Sayaka's Father
The Tokyo Night Sky Is Always the Densest Shade of Blue (2017), Iwashita
Love At Least (2018)
Louder!: Can't Hear What You're Singin', Wimp (2018)
Ten Years Japan (2018)
The House Where the Mermaid Sleeps (2018), Dr. Shindō
Day and Night (2019), Ryohei Miyake
The Journalist (2019), Tada
Stolen Identity 2 (2020)
Signal the Movie (2021)
Ride or Die (2021)
Your Turn to Kill: The Movie (2021), Masakazu Minami
Tombi: Father and Son (2022)
Shin Ultraman (2022), Tatsuhiko Munakata
The Last 10 Years (2022), Dr. Hirata
Emergency Interrogation Room: The Final (2023), Katsutoshi Kajiyama

Television
Sanbiki ga Kiru! (2002)
Shinsengumi! (2004), Matsumoto Ryōjun
Himitsu no Hanazono (2007)
Last Friends (2008)
Bloody Monday (2008)
Ryōmaden (2010) - Tokugawa Yoshinobu
Diplomat Kosaku Kuroda (2011), Kazuhiko Niida
Penance (2012)
Gunshi Kanbei (2014), Araki Murashige
Bitter Blood (2014), Hisashi Koga
Emergency Interrogation Room (2014–2021), Katsutoshi Kajiyama
Love Song (2016), Taizō Masumura
Crisis (2017), Mitsunari Yoshinaga
Manpuku (2019)
Two Homelands (2019), Orson Aikawa
Your Turn to Kill (2019)
Ranman (2023), Seiichi Tokunaga

Plays
Hamlet (1995)
A Midsummer Night's Dream (1996)
Amor Vincit Omnia (1998)
MacBeth (1999)
Waiting for Godot (2000)
A Streetcar Named Desire (2001-2003)
Wuthering Heights (2002)
Das Schloss (2005)

References

External links
 Tetsushi Tanaka at Dongyu

Japanese male actors
1966 births
Living people
Actors from Mie Prefecture